The 7107 International Music Festival was a two-day outdoor international music festival that took place in Global Gateway Logistics City in Clark Freeport Zone, Pampanga, Philippines. It took place from February 22 to 23, 2014. Founded and produced by Tina Herrera and Mike Pio Roda, the event was held to introduce Filipino talent to a global audience.

Annual details

2014 Edition

Day One 
Kaskade and Alvaro performed 75-minute sets; while Natives, Reid Stefan, Kid Ink, DJ Riddler, The Asteroids Galaxy Tour and Canadian hip hop artist Immerze played for 60 minutes.  Other performers for the day included: Kjwan, Radioactive Sago Project, Taken by Cars, Runmanila, Maude, Runway Crimes, Techy Romantics, Wilderness, Musical O, Sleepwalk Circus, Hidden Nikki, Child/ren of the Pilgrimage, The Charmes, The Sleepyheads, DJ Nix Damn P, DJ Bcal, DJ Katsy Lee, DJ Patrick Po, DJ Motherbasss, DJ Skratchmark

Day Two 
Red Hot Chili Peppers performed a full 90-minute set; Kendrick Lamar, Empire of the Sun and Red Jumpsuit Apparatus played 60 minutes each; while Luciana and Scarlet Heroes played 30 minutes each.  Other performers for the day included: Up Dharma Down, Sponge Cola, Pulso, Jensen & The Flips, Abra & Loonie, Encounters with a Yeti, Rocksteddy, Itchyworms, Shes Only Sixteen, Cheats, Yolanda Moon, Skymarines, The Ringmaster, Populardays, Not Another Boyband, DJ Keith Bryan Haw, DJ Marc Marasigan, DJ Aryan & Travis Monsod, DJ Ron Poe, DJ Carlo Atendido, DJ Jessica Milner

2015 Edition 
No festival was held.  In an interview, co-producer Mike Pio Roda hinted on a possible revival of the festival in the near future.

Musicians

The following are some of the music artists and bands that played at the festival:
Red Hot Chili Peppers, performed songs such as "Dani California," "Under The Bridge," and "Californication."
Empire of the Sun
The Asteroids Galaxy Tour
Red Jumpsuit Apparatus
Natives (band)
Kendrick Lamar
DJ Alvaro
DJ Kaskade
Reid Stefan
Up Dharma Down
Kjwan
Radioactive Sago Project
Sponge Cola
Taken By Cars
RunManila
Pulso
Scarlet Heroes
DJ Luciana
Maude
Runway Crimes
Techy Romantics
Wilderness
Musical O
Sleepwalk Circus
Hidden Nikki
Child/ren of the Pilgrimage
The Chargmes
The Sleepyheads
Jensen & The Flips
Abra & Loonie
Encounters with a Yeti
Rocksteddy
Itchyworms
Shes Only Sixteen
Cheats
Yolanda Moon
Skymarines
The Ringmaster
Populardays
Not Another Boyband
DJ Nix Damn P
DJ Bcal
DJ Katsy Lee
DJ Patrick Po
DJ Motherbasss
DJ Skratchmark
DJ Keith Bryan Haw
DJ Marc Marasigan
DJ Aryan & Travis Monsod
DJ Ron Poe
DJ Carlo Atendido
DJ Jessica Milner

Controversies
Just before the music festival was held, rumors about that the event was funded by alleged scammer Janet Lim Napoles went out on the internet. Another issue was when a young actor and three others were caught by the authority after allegedly smoking Marijuana inside the event. The young actor was identified by the police officers as Kit Thompson, Juan Paolo Serafica, Geani Dionisio, and the fourth was still a minor.

See also
 List of electronic music festivals
 List of music festivals
 Music of the Philippines

References

Music festivals established in 2013
Culture of Pampanga
Electronic music festivals in the Philippines
2014 music festivals
2014 in Philippine music